Daniel Lopatin (born July 25, 1982), best known as Oneohtrix Point Never or OPN, is an American experimental electronic music producer, composer, singer and songwriter. His music has experimented with tropes from various music genres and eras, sample-based song structures, and elaborate MIDI production.

He began releasing synth-based recordings in the mid-2000s and received initial acclaim for the 2009 compilation Rifts, as well as the influential vaporwave release Chuck Person's Eccojams Vol. 1 (2010). He subsequently signed to Warp in 2013, and has released studio albums on the label since. He has also composed scores for films such as Good Time (2017) and Uncut Gems (2019); the former won him the Soundtrack Award at the 2017 Cannes Film Festival.

Biography

Early life 
Born and raised in Massachusetts, Lopatin is the son of Russian-Jewish "refusenik" emigrants from the Soviet Union, both with musical backgrounds. Some of his first experiments with electronic music were inspired by his father's collection of dubbed jazz fusion and Stevie Wonder tapes, and his Roland Juno-60 synthesizer, an instrument that Lopatin would inherit and go on to use extensively. In high school, Lopatin played synthesizer in groups with friend and future collaborator Joel Ford, performing at school events. Lopatin attended Hampshire College in Massachusetts before moving to Brooklyn, New York to attend grad school at Pratt Institute, studying archival science. During that time, he became involved in Brooklyn's underground noise music scene.

2007–2012: Early career 
Lopatin initially released music under a number of aliases and as part of several groups, including Infinity Window and Astronaut, before adopting the pseudonym Oneohtrix Point Never, a verbal play on the name of the Boston FM radio station Magic 106.7. Early OPN recordings drew on synthesizer music, '80s new age tropes, and contemporary noise music. Lopatin released a series of cassette and CD-R projects interspersed with a trilogy of full-length albums: Betrayed in the Octagon (2007), Zones Without People (2009), and Russian Mind (2009). Much of this material was eventually collected on the 2009 compilation Rifts, which brought him international acclaim; it was named the second-best album of 2009 by UK magazine The Wire. Also in 2009, Lopatin released the audio-visual project Memory Vague, which included his profile-raising YouTube video "nobody here". His work during this period would be associated with the late 2000s underground hypnagogic pop trend.

In June 2010, Lopatin followed Rifts with his major label debut Returnal, released on Editions Mego. In the same year, he released the influential limited-edition pseudonymous cassette Chuck Person's Eccojams Vol. 1, which would help inspire the 2010s Internet-based genre vaporwave, and he formed the duo Games (later renamed Ford & Lopatin) with childhood friend Joel Ford. Lopatin's next album, Replica, was released in 2011 on his newly formed label Software Recording, to further critical praise. On it, Lopatin developed a sample-based approach that drew on the audio of 1980s and '90s television advertisements. Also that year, Lopatin participated in the collaborative album FRKWYS Vol. 7 with musicians David Borden, James Ferraro, Samuel Godin and Laurel Halo as part of RVNG's label series; Ford & Lopatin released Channel Pressure, and OPN was chosen to perform at the All Tomorrow's Parties festival. Lopatin and visual artist Nate Boyce collaborated on the 2011 Reliquary House performance installation; the music from this project would later be released on the split OPN/Rene Hell album Music for Reliquary House / In 1980 I Was a Blue Square (2012). In 2012, Lopatin collaborated with Tim Hecker on the album Instrumental Tourist.

2013–2016: Signing with Warp 
In 2013, Lopatin signed with Warp Records. His label debut, R Plus Seven, was released on September 30, 2013, to positive reception. Lopatin collaborated with several artists on visual accompaniments, live performances, and internet projects for the album, among them his frequent collaborator Nate Boyce; Jon Rafman; Takeshi Murata; Jacob Ciocci, and John Michael Boling. Also in 2013, Lopatin composed his first film score—for Sofia Coppola's film The Bling Ring, a collaboration with Brian Reitzell—and OPN participated in the Warp x Tate event and was commissioned to create a piece inspired by Jeremy Deller's The History of the World.

In 2014, Lopatin supported Nine Inch Nails on their tour with Soundgarden, as a replacement for Death Grips. On October 4, 2014, he presented a world premiere live soundtrack for Koji Morimoto's 1995 anime film Magnetic Rose. The event took place at the Jodrell Bank Centre for Astrophysics, and featured Anohni on a rendition of the OPN song "Returnal" as well as audio-visual works from Nate Boyce which have been hosted by the Barbican Centre in London, the Museum of Modern Art and MoMA PS1. In the same year, OPN released Commissions I for Record Store Day, featuring several commissioned pieces. He also contributed "Need" to the Bleep:10 compilation in celebration of the online retailer's 10th anniversary. This was followed by Commissions II in 2015.

Lopatin released his second Warp LP Garden of Delete in November 2015 following an enigmatic promotional campaign. He also composed the score for the 2015 film Partisan, directed by Ariel Kleiman. In 2016, Lopatin contributed to British singer Anohni's 2016 album Hopelessness and 2017 EP Paradise as well as Chicago footwork producer DJ Earl's 2016 album Open Your Eyes. In Fall 2016, UCLA's Hammer Museum hosted the film series Ecco: The Videos of Oneohtrix Point Never and Related Works, dedicated to the visual work of Lopatin and his collaborators.

2017–present: Age Of and Magic Oneohtrix Point Never 
In January 2017, a collaboration between OPN and FKA twigs was confirmed. In 2017, OPN provided the soundtrack for the film Good Time, directed by Ben & Josh Safdie. He won the Soundtrack Award at the 2017 Cannes Film Festival for his work on the film, which included a collaboration with singer Iggy Pop entitled "The Pure and the Damned". The film's soundtrack was released via Warp on August 11, 2017.

In June 2018, Lopatin released his eighth studio album Age Of on Warp. The album was accompanied by Myriad, an expansive conceptual live project dubbed a "concertscape" and "four-part epochal song cycle" and featuring collaborations with live musicians and the visual artists Daniel Swan, David Rudnick, and Nate Boyce; the project was premiered at the Park Avenue Armory in May 2018. Also in 2018, OPN collaborated with David Byrne on his LP American Utopia. In 2019, he composed the original score to the Safdie Brothers' 2019 feature film Uncut Gems.

In 2020, he collaborated with The Weeknd on the album After Hours, producing two and writing three of its songs. On September 25, he announced the release of his ninth album, titled Magic Oneohtrix Point Never, which was released on October 30, 2020. Lopatin was the musical director for the Weeknd's band during the Super Bowl LV halftime show in February 2021. He again collaborated with The Weeknd on the album Dawn FM, released in January 2022, on which he wrote and produced 13 songs, as well as serving as executive producer alongside The Weeknd and Max Martin.

Musical style 
Lopatin's work has recontextualized sounds from different eras, ranging from the "vintage synth oddities" of his early work "to the '90s TV commercial-sampling Replica and the alt-rock-inspired Garden of Delete", according to AllMusic's Heather Phares. Jon Pareles of The New York Times noted that Lopatin has engaged with "a broad and deeply idiosyncratic array of genres, samples, sources and strategies, from minimalism to collage to noise", often using "snippets of material — ad jingles, saccharine pop productions, throwaway dialogue — that he can't entirely dismiss as kitsch." For Stereogum, Lindsey Rhoades described Lopatin as "almost more of a philosopher/sound-collagist than he is a musician", noting his tendency to "elevate sounds otherwise considered cheesy" and prompt reflection "about why you have aversions to certain tones and timbres, and why others immediately bring childhood impressions screaming back into your brain." Lopatin's musical influences have variously included Mahavishnu Orchestra, DJ Premier and My Bloody Valentine. He has also cited literary influences, including Romanian pessimist philosopher Emil Cioran, and science fiction authors Stanisław Lem and Philip K. Dick.

Discography

Studio albums 
 Betrayed in the Octagon (2007, Deception Island)
 Zones Without People (2009, Arbor)
 Russian Mind (2009, No Fun)
 Returnal (2010, Editions Mego)
 Replica (2011, Software)
 R Plus Seven (2013, Warp)
 Garden of Delete (2015, Warp)
 Age Of (2018, Warp)
 Magic Oneohtrix Point Never (2020, Warp)
 TBA (2023)

Compilation albums 
 Rifts (2009, No Fun)
 Drawn and Quartered (2013, Software)
 The Fall into Time (2013, Software)

Soundtrack albums 
 Good Time (2017, Warp)
 Uncut Gems (2019, Warp) as Daniel Lopatin

Awards and nominations

References

External links 

 
 
 Original YouTube account sunsetcorp

Living people
1982 births
American electronic musicians
American experimental musicians
American keyboardists
American male singer-songwriters
American people of Russian-Jewish descent
Ambient musicians
Collage filmmakers
Hypnagogic pop musicians
Jewish American musicians
Musicians from Boston
Pratt Institute alumni
Record producers from Massachusetts
Vaporwave musicians
Warp (record label) artists
Daniel Lopatin